Joe Jackson (born July 27, 1953) is a former American football linebacker who played two seasons with the Winnipeg Blue Bombers of the Canadian Football League. He was drafted by the Miami Dolphins in the tenth round of the 1975 NFL Draft. He played college football at Pennsylvania State University.

College career
Jackson played for the Penn State Nittany Lions. He returned an onside kick for a touchdown in the 1975 Cotton Bowl.

Professional career
Jackson was selected by the Miami Dolphins with the 256th pick in the 1975 NFL Draft as a tight end or wide receiver. He was released by the Dolphins in August 1975.

He played in twelve games for the Winnipeg Blue Bombers from 1975 to 1976.

References

External links
Just Sports Stats

Living people
1953 births
Players of American football from Massachusetts
American football linebackers
Canadian football linebackers
African-American players of American football
African-American players of Canadian football
Penn State Nittany Lions football players
Winnipeg Blue Bombers players
People from Chicopee, Massachusetts
21st-century African-American people
20th-century African-American sportspeople